Tiny House Hunting is an American reality television series that premiered on the FYI cable channel on December 22, 2014. The series features real estate agents helping people who desire to live a tiny house with their families in response to tiny house movement. The show accompanies Tiny House Nation and Tiny House World, another series about tiny homes aired on the same network.

"We’ve done a lot of research into social trends, both for these shows and the network in general," said Gena McCarthy, a vice president of network's programming. "And what we found is that although there are all age groups involved, the tiny-house movement is mostly a social movement created for millennials," she also added before the show's premiere.

References

External links 
 
 

2010s American reality television series
2014 American television series debuts
English-language television shows
FYI (American TV channel) original programming